At least three naval vessels of Japan have borne the name Chōkai:

 , a  heavy cruiser, which saw service in World War II
  a  guided missile destroyer commissioned in 1998

Imperial Japanese Navy ship names
Japanese Navy ship names